Drayton Green railway station is in the London Borough of Ealing in west London, and is in Travelcard Zone 4.

History 
It first opened as Drayton Green Halt, named after a nearby park and open space called Drayton Green.

Since 2008, no ticket machines are available at the station, travelling is only possible using contactless payment cards, such as those of most UK banks or the Oyster card, or using pre-paid tickets and passes.

Service

There is no Sunday service at the station.

Connections
London Buses routes E1 and E11 serve the station.

References

External links

Railway stations in the London Borough of Ealing
DfT Category F2 stations
Former Great Western Railway stations
Railway stations in Great Britain opened in 1905
Railway stations served by Great Western Railway